"Bang Bang" is a song written by Iggy Pop and Ivan Kral in 1981 for Pop's Party album. It was released as a single, charting at #35 on the Billboard Club Play Singles chart. According to Pop's autobiography I Need More, he wrote "Bang Bang" as Arista Records wanted a single and he promised them a commercial album. He originally wanted Phil Spector or Mike Chapman to produce the song. Instead, songwriter Tommy Boyce was brought in. Pop claimed he got the idea for the song from reading The Right Stuff at a local bookstore.

Personnel
 Iggy Pop – vocals
 Ivan Kral – guitar, keyboards
 Rob Duprey – guitar
 Michael Page – bass
 Douglas Bowne – drums
 Jimmy Whizner – arrangements

David Bowie version

Pop's friend David Bowie covered "Bang Bang" for his 1987 album Never Let Me Down. When asked about his choice of including Pop's song on the album (instead of perhaps co-writing a new song), Bowie stated "Iggy's done so many good songs that people never get to hear ... I think it's one of his best songs, 'Bang Bang,' and it hasn't been heard, and now it might be." Released as a promotional single in late 1987, the live version includes Peter Frampton on guitar. In 2018, Bowie's original album version was re-engineered as part of Bowie's posthumous Never Let Me Down 2018 release.

Track listing

Chart position

References

Iggy Pop songs
David Bowie songs
1981 songs
American new wave songs
Dance-rock songs
Songs written by Iggy Pop
Songs written by Ivan Kral